Ambar is an unincorporated community in King George County, Virginia, United States.

Eagle's Nest was listed on the National Register of Historic Places in 1992.

References

Unincorporated communities in Virginia
Unincorporated communities in King George County, Virginia